Margalida Prohens Rigo (born 24 May 1982) is a Spanish People's Party (PP) politician. She served in the Parliament of the Balearic Islands from 2011 to 2019, and the Congress of Deputies. In 2021, she became president of the People's Party of the Balearic Islands.

Biography
Born in Campos, Mallorca, Prohens graduated in Translation and Interpretation from Pompeu Fabra University in Barcelona. She joined the New Generations of the People's Party in 2005.

Elected to the Parliament of the Balearic Islands in 2011, she served as the PP spokesperson within it from 2015 until Biel Company took over in 2018. She was announced as the party's candidate for the Congress of Deputies for the Balearic constituency in the April 2019 Spanish general election; Maria Salom had originally been named but was then moved to be the Senate candidate.

In July 2018, new PP President Pablo Casado named Prohens the party's Secretary of Internal Communication. Three years later, she ran unopposed to be president of the People's Party of the Balearic Islands, succeeding Company. In February 2022, she was one of several regional PP leaders to withdraw confidence in Casado, leading to the 20th National Congress of the People's Party. She then endorsed Alberto Núñez Feijóo.

References

1982 births
Living people
People from Mallorca
Pompeu Fabra University alumni
People's Party (Spain) politicians
Members of the Parliament of the Balearic Islands
Members of the 13th Congress of Deputies (Spain)
Members of the 14th Congress of Deputies (Spain)